Ivan Fedorovich Nikishov (also Nikishev) (1894 – August 5, 1956) was a Soviet NKVD Lieutenant General and director of Dalstroy.

Biography
Nikishov was born in 1894 the son of a peasant in Varkino, in the Saratov Governorate of the Russian Empire (now Volgograd Oblast). He joined the Communist Party in 1919. He entered a career in the NKVD and became its head for Azerbaijan in 1937, where he directed the purges. In 1938 and 1939 he was the head of the NKVD at Khabarovsk.

In 1940 Nikishov was appointed director of the Dalstroy organization. At Magadan he divorced his wife and married the commandant of the women's camp, Alexandra Gridassova (rus.). The couple established a life of luxury in the Siberian wilderness replete with servants, cooks, chauffeurs, and a cultural brigade for entertainment. Nikishov increased the gold production from the Kolyma mines. His difficulties in securing supplies for his operation were solved when the Lend-Lease program went into effect; he could divert cargo delivered to Magadan for services in the Gulag. Ships of the Dalstroy fleet were sent to the United States for overhaul and repair for their duty to transport prisoners to the Gulag. In 1944, Nikishov and NKVD general Goglidze were successful in presenting to the impressionable Henry A. Wallace, the American Vice President, a sanitized version of the Dalstroy enterprise. On 20 January 1944, he was awarded the title Hero of Socialist Labour for increasing the production of raw materials in Dalstroy.

Investigations for abuse of state funds and debauchery were initiated and he retired in 1948. He died in his bath in 1956.

Nikishov was a candidate member of  the Central Committee of the Communist Party of the Soviet Union from 1939 to 1952.

Awards
 Hero of Socialist Labor
 Order of Lenin
 Order of the Red Banner of Labour

References

Sources

1894 births
1956 deaths
People from Volgograd Oblast
People from Tsaritsynsky Uyezd
Central Committee of the Communist Party of the Soviet Union candidate members
Members of the Supreme Soviet of the Soviet Union
Soviet lieutenant generals
Commissars 3rd Class of State Security
Gulag
Russian military personnel of World War I
Heroes of Socialist Labour
Recipients of the Order of Lenin
Recipients of the Order of the Red Banner
Recipients of the Order of Kutuzov, 1st class